is a Japanese football player. He plays for Suzuka Unlimited FC.

Club statistics
Updated to 31 December 2015.

References

External links

1990 births
Living people
Kyushu Kyoritsu University alumni
Association football people from Fukuoka Prefecture
Japanese footballers
J2 League players
J3 League players
Giravanz Kitakyushu players
Blaublitz Akita players
Suzuka Point Getters players
Association football forwards